Sergeyevo is a rural locality (a village) in Kichmegnskoye Rural Settlement, Kichmengsko-Gorodetsky District, Vologda Oblast, Russia. The population was 32 as of 2002.

Geography 
Sergeyevo is located 39 km northeast of Kichmengsky Gorodok (the district's administrative centre) by road. Kontiyevo is the nearest rural locality.

References 

Rural localities in Kichmengsko-Gorodetsky District